John Donald "Jake" Rathwell (born August 12, 1947) is a Canadian former professional ice hockey right winger who played in one National Hockey League game for the Boston Bruins during the 1974–75 NHL season, on January 23, 1975 against the Kansas City Scouts. The rest of his career, which lasted from 1968 to 1975, was spent in the minor leagues.

Career statistics

Regular season and playoffs

See also
List of players who played only one game in the NHL

External links

1947 births
Living people
Boston Bruins players
Canadian expatriate ice hockey players in the United States
Canadian ice hockey right wingers
Cincinnati Swords players
Clinton Comets players
Ice hockey people from Quebec
Iowa Stars (CHL) players
Kitchener Rangers players
People from Abitibi-Témiscamingue
Peterborough Petes (ice hockey) players
Portland Buckaroos players
Rochester Americans players
Salt Lake Golden Eagles (WHL) players
San Diego Gulls (WHL) players
Verdun Maple Leafs (ice hockey) players